The 1998 Nokia Cup, southern Ontario men's provincial curling championship was held February 10-15 at the Peterborough Memorial Centre in Peterborough, Ontario. The winning rink of Wayne Middaugh, Graeme McCarrel, Ian Tetley and Scott Bailey from Etobicoke would go on to represent Ontario at the 1998 Labatt Brier in Winnipeg, Manitoba.

Teams

Standings

Tiebreaker
Daniel def. Howard

Playoffs

Final
February 15, 2:00pm

External links
Coverage on CurlingZone

Reference

Ontario
Ontario Tankard
Sport in Peterborough, Ontario
1998 in Ontario
February 1998 sports events in Canada